Hermann Wilker (24 July 1874 – 27 December 1941) was a German rower who competed in the 1900 Summer Olympics and in the 1912 Summer Olympics. In 1900 he was a crew member of the German boat, which won the bronze medal in the coxed fours. Twelve years later he won the gold medal in the coxed fours as part of the German team.

References

External links

 
 
 

1874 births
1941 deaths
Rowers at the 1900 Summer Olympics
Rowers at the 1912 Summer Olympics
Olympic rowers of Germany
Olympic gold medalists for Germany
Olympic bronze medalists for Germany
Olympic medalists in rowing
German male rowers
Medalists at the 1912 Summer Olympics
Medalists at the 1900 Summer Olympics
People from Frankenthal
Sportspeople from Rhineland-Palatinate